The 2014 IIFA Awards, officially known as the 15th International Indian Film Academy Awards ceremony, presented by the International Indian Film Academy honouring the best Hindi films of 2014, took place between 23 and 26 April 2014. The official ceremony took place on 26 April 2014 at the Raymond James Stadium in Tampa, Florida, in the United States for the very first time. The ceremony was televised in India and internationally on Star Plus for the tenth & last consecutive year. The ceremony was co-hosted by actors Shahid Kapoor and Farhan Akhtar, returning as hosts for the third and second time respectively.

IIFA Rocks, otherwise known as the IIFA Music and Fashion Extravaganza took place on 25 April 2014. During the event, the technical awards were presented by actor Saif Ali Khan.

Bhaag Milkha Bhaag led the ceremony with 19 nominations, followed by Goliyon Ki Raasleela Ram-Leela and Yeh Jawaani Hai Deewani with 8 nominations each, and Aashiqui 2 and Krrish 3 with 6 nominations each.

Bhaag Milkha Bhaag won 14 awards, including Best Film, Best Director (for Rakeysh Omprakash Mehra), Best Actor (for Farhan Akhtar) and Best Supporting Actress (for Divya Dutta), thus becoming the most-awarded film at the ceremony.

Deepika Padukone received triple nominations for Best Actress for her performances in Chennai Express, Goliyon Ki Raasleela Ram-Leela and Yeh Jawaani Hai Deewani, winning for Chennai Express.

Winners and nominees

Popular awards

Special awards

Musical awards

Technical awards

Hindi Films with multiple nominations

19: Bhaag Milkha Bhaag 
8: Goliyon Ki Raasleela Ram-Leela
7: Yeh Jawaani Hai Deewani, Krrish 3 and Aashiqui 2
6: Chennai Express
4: Kai Po Che!
3: The Lunchbox
2: D-Day, Lootera and Jolly LLB

Hindi Films with multiple awards

14: Bhaag Milkha Bhaag
4: Aashiqui 2
3: Chennai Express
2: Yeh Jawaani Hai Deewani, Krrish 3

See also

International Indian Film Academy Awards
Bollywood
Cinema of India

External links

References

Ifa Awards
2014 Indian film awards
2014 in Florida
21st century in Tampa, Florida
IIFA awards